Myoschilos is a genus of flowering plants belonging to the family Santalaceae.

Its native range is Southern Southe America.

Species
Species:
 Myoschilos oblongus Ruiz & Pav.

References

Santalaceae
Santalales genera